Folke Wahlgren was a Swedish bandy player. Wahlgren was part of the Djurgården Swedish champions' team of 1912.

References

Swedish bandy players
Djurgårdens IF Bandy players
Year of birth missing
Year of death missing